Zelenikovo Municipality is a municipality in the central part of North Macedonia. The municipal seat is located in the village Zelenikovo. The municipality is located in the Skopje Statistical Region.

Geography
The municipality borders Studeničani Municipality to the west, Petrovec Municipality to the northeast, Čaška Municipality to the south, and Veles Municipality to the southeast.

Demographics
According to the 2021 Macedonian census, Zelenikovo Municipality has 3,361 inhabitants. Ethnic groups in the municipality:

References

External links
 Official website

 
Skopje Statistical Region
Municipalities of North Macedonia